Wilbur is an unincorporated community in Gregg Township, Morgan County, in the U.S. state of Indiana.

History
Wilbur was founded in the 1830s. A post office was established at Wilbur in 1873, and remained in operation until it was discontinued in 1906.

The Wilbur School was listed on the National Register of Historic Places in 1993.

Geography

References

Unincorporated communities in Morgan County, Indiana
Unincorporated communities in Indiana
Indianapolis metropolitan area